The Magnificent Tony Carrera is a 1968 Spanish-German-Italian Eurospy film written and directed by José Antonio de la Loma and starring Thomas Hunter. It was originally shot in 70 mm. Roger Moore was initially cast in the title role, but he had to leave the set because of a car accident.

Cast  
 Thomas Hunter as Tony Carrera
 Gila von Weitershausen as Ursula Beaulieu
 Fernando Sancho as Professor Einstein
 Walter Barnes as Senator Barnes
 Erika Blanc as Antonella Arnaldini
 Alberto Farnese as Rick
 Gérard Tichy as Serge
 Dieter Augustin as Offizier
 Antonio Casas as Commissioner van Heuven
 Ini Assmann as Sammy
 Enzo Fiermonte as Arnaldo
 Hans Waldherr as Peppino

References

External links
 

1968 films
1960s heist films
1960s spy thriller films
Spanish spy thriller films
Italian auto racing films
Italian heist films
Italian spy thriller films
West German films
German auto racing films
German spy thriller films
Films directed by José Antonio de la Loma
Films set in Amsterdam
1960s Italian films
1960s Spanish films
1960s German films